Tara Veer is a Canadian politician, who was elected mayor of Red Deer, Alberta in the 2013 municipal election. She was the youngest mayor at age 35, and the second woman of the city's history, after Gail Surkan, to be elected mayor of the city.

Prior to her election as mayor, Veer served on Red Deer City Council for nine years.

Veer was re-elected in a landslide vote against challenger Sean Burke in the 2017 municipal election.

Veer did not seek re-election in the 2021 municipal election, and was succeeded by Ken Johnston.

References

1977 births
Mayors of Red Deer, Alberta
Women mayors of places in Alberta
Living people
21st-century Canadian politicians
21st-century Canadian women politicians